Benny Ray Bailey (born November 16, 1944) is a former Democratic member of the Kentucky Senate. He lives in Hindman, Kentucky.

References

Living people
1944 births
Democratic Party Kentucky state senators
People from Hindman, Kentucky
Place of birth missing (living people)